The relict darter (Etheostoma chienense) is a rare species of freshwater ray-finned fish, a darter from the subfamily Etheostomatinae, part of the family Percidae, which also contains the perches, ruffes and pikeperches. It is endemic to Kentucky, where it occurs only in the drainage of the Bayou du Chien. It is a federally listed endangered species of the United States.

The Relict Darter is part of the Etheostoma squamiceps species complex and was formally described in 1992. It grows up to about 7.2 cm in length and is characterized by "lollipop-like" white knobs on the second dorsal fin of the male that develops during the breeding season. The species is only found in a 35 km stretch of the Bayou du Chien, a tributary of the Mississippi River in Kentucky. It shelters in areas where the riverbank is undercut and water flows beneath a mat of roots. The substrate is sand and gravel covered in leaf litter. This type of habitat is not continuous on the river, leaving wide spaces between patches of appropriate habitat.

The Relict Darters diet is mainly insects. During reproduction, eggs are stuck to the undersides of sticks and rocks. Only one spawning area has been observed.

This species is limited to one small river system which has been altered and no longer has much habitat or appropriate spawning areas. Agriculture and the channelization of the river have affected these changes.

References

External links
Etheostoma chienense. FishBase.

Etheostoma
Endemic fauna of Kentucky
Fish of the United States
Fish described in 1992
ESA endangered species